The Journal of Medical Screening is a quarterly peer-reviewed medical journal covering medical screening. It was established in 1994 and is published by SAGE Publications. The editor-in-chief is Nicholas Wald (Wolfson Institute of Preventive Medicine). According to the Journal Citation Reports, the journal has a 2017 impact factor of 2.689, ranking it 50th out of 180 journals in the category "Public, Environmental & Occupational Health".

References

External links

Quarterly journals
SAGE Publishing academic journals
Publications established in 1994
Preventive medicine journals
Public health journals
English-language journals